Glen Innes was an electoral district of the Legislative Assembly in the Australian state of New South Wales, named after Glen Innes. It was created in 1880 and gained a second member in 1889, with voters casting two votes with the two leading candidates being elected. In 1894, it became a single-member electorate and, in 1904, it was abolished and replaced by Gough.

Members for Glen Innes

Election results

Notes

References

Former electoral districts of New South Wales
1880 establishments in Australia
Constituencies established in 1880
1904 disestablishments in Australia
Constituencies disestablished in 1904
New England (New South Wales)